George Fan (born 1978) is an American video game designer who currently works as the creative director of All Yes Good. He is known for designing Plants vs. Zombies (2009) whilst working at PopCap Games, in addition to developing Insaniquarium (2001) and Octogeddon (2018). Before going into game design, Fan graduated from the University of California, Berkeley, in 2000 with a degree in computer science. After graduating, he worked under Arcade Planet to develop games for their website, Prizegames.com. He eventually formed Flying Bear Entertainment and created Insaniquarium, which became a finalist for the 2002 Independent Games Festival. He then joined Blizzard Entertainment and worked there while simultaneously developing Insaniquarium further for PopCap Games, releasing the "Deluxe" edition in 2004.

Fan left Blizzard and started developing Plants vs. Zombies. He became a full-time employee for PopCap, who supplied Fan with a team. Upon release in 2009, it became the best-selling game developed by PopCap. EA bought PopCap Games in 2011 and Fan was laid off after his studio was closed down in 2012. Fan started developing Octogeddon and submitted it to the 2012 Ludum Dare contest. Fan formed a developing company named All Yes Good with Rich Werner and Kurt Pfeffer and developed Octogeddon further before releasing it in 2018.

Early life and education
George Fan was born in 1978. Fan grew up with his brother and lived with their father. Fan attended the University of California, Berkeley and graduated with a degree in computer science in 2000.

Career

Early career
Fan first worked as creator of Java video games for the online gaming portal, Prizegames.com, created by the company Arcade Planet. Fan describes the website as "an online version of Chuck E. Cheese". The first video game he designed was the puzzle game, Wrath of the Gopher, released in 2001. Fan said to Chris Carter, editor-in-chief of Destructoid, that before creating Wrath of the Gopher, he was unsure of whether or not he could be a game designer.

Flying Bear Entertainment, Insaniquarium, and Blizzard Entertainment
While researching Java games, Fan discovered PopCap Games and took a liking to their game library. In 2001, Fan and Tysen Henderson founded Flying Bear Entertainment in California to work on a virtual pets video game project named FishTank. Fan wanted to create a game "that's easy to get into, yet unfolds into something much deeper." Flying Bear Entertainment published it on August 31, 2001, as a free Java-based online game called Insaniquarium. Fan entered the game into the 2002 Independent Games Festival, to which it became a finalist for. At the finalist booth at Game Developers Conference 2002 (GDC 2002), PopCap Games offered Fan help in making Insaniquarium a downloadable game. Insaniquarium won in the category of "Innovation in Game Design".

At the time, Fan was looking for a job at Blizzard Entertainment. Blizzard allowed Fan to work on Insaniquarium on his breaks from working with them. Because he was a freelance video game designer at the time, Fan was forced to do a majority of the programming and designing of Insaniquarium, along with composing some of the music. With PopCap Games as the publisher, Insaniquarium was released on 2004 for the PC, titled Insaniquarium: Deluxe and was met with critical and financial success. The game sold 20 million copies on the PC by April 2006, and was released for mobile phones by Glu Mobile in the United States on April 13, 2006, and in Europe on June 29, 2006. The game was also released for Palm OS smartphones, Windows Mobile phones, and personal digital assistants on August 6, 2008.

Fan worked for Blizzard for two and a half years. He was tasked with programming AI and designing enemies for Diablo III during this time. It was not long after Insaniquarium was released that Fan realized that he was more of a designer than a programmer. Fan tried to become a designer at Blizzard, though found it hard to persuade other employees to his ideas, leading him to conclude that he preferred to work in smaller teams.

PopCap Games and Plants vs. Zombies
Fan left Blizzard to become an independent game designer for a year. Fan eventually became inspired by Insaniquarium and Warcraft III mods to create a new game. Fan thought about creating a defense-oriented version of Insaniquarium for the Nintendo DS utilizing its dual-screen. However, after playing Warcraft III tower defense mods, he wondered if plants could make good defensive structures. Fan wanted to bring new concepts to the tower defense genre and found enemies ignoring the defensive structures unintuitive, which led to the use of lanes. The enemies, though initially planned to be aliens from Insaniquarium, became zombies to make the game distinctive from other plant games. The working title was Weedlings. After the enemies were changed from aliens to zombies, the game was renamed Plants vs. Zombies.

Initially, Fan worked on Plants vs. Zombies independently. He became a full-time employee for PopCap Games after they convinced him that joining them would help him make the best game. PopCap set Fan up with a team consisting of Tod Semple, Rich Werner, and Laura Shigihara, who each filled the role of programmer, artist, and composer respectively. Plants vs. Zombies took three and a half years to make. Aside from Insaniquarium and Warcraft III, Plants vs. Zombies was influenced by the arcade game Tapper, the card game Magic: the Gathering, and the film Swiss Family Robinson. A critical aspect of developing was designing the game to be balanced between casual and hardcore gaming.

Plants vs. Zombies was released on May 5, 2009, for the PC and Mac OS X. The game garnered positive reception from critics, being assigned an aggregate score of 87/100 by Metacritic. It quickly became the best-selling video game developed by PopCap Games. James Gwertzman, the vice president of the Asia/Pacific division of PopCap, revealed in a presentation at GDC China 2010 that the game had sold 1.5 million copies internationally. Plants vs. Zombies has been ported to various platforms, including the iOS, Xbox 360, and Nintendo DS.

There were various other projects designed by Fan for PopCap that were either canceled or unannounced. One of them was a role-playing video game called Yeti Train, which was rumored to become a new franchise after a trademark for the title was filed by PopCap in 2009, though in March 2011, David Roberts, CEO of PopCap, declined there being any plans to release new franchises. Another game in production was Full Contact Bingo.

On July 12, 2011, PopCap and its assets were bought by Electronic Arts (EA) for $750million. EA envisioned Plants vs. Zombies as a major franchise, with the sequel using a freemium model, which resulted in Fan losing interest in Plants vs. Zombies. According to Jason Schreier of Kotaku, when EA directed PopCap towards making free-to-play games with transactions, "Fan no longer fit in." In August 2012, 50 employees either left or were laid off from PopCap's Seattle studio, with studios in Dublin; Shanghai; and San Mateo, California  where Fan worked at the time  closing. Fan was fired during this time after months of discussion from PopCap's management team. A circulating rumor that Fan was fired because of his opposition to EA's freemium model was based on a statement by Edmund McMillen, the creator of The Binding of Isaac and Super Meat Boy. George Fan refused to comment publicly on the truth of this story.

All Yes Good and Octogeddon
After his lay-off, Fan created the arcade-style action video game Octogeddon for the 2012 Ludum Dare contest, a contest where developers have to create a game in 48 hours within a specific theme. The 2012 theme was "evolution"; Fan designed Octogeddon to fit that theme by having the octopus gain weaponized limbs over time. The game was met with positive reception in the contest, inspiring Fan to work on the game more. He formed the indie video game company, All Yes Good, along with Werner  the artist for Plants vs. Zombies  and Kert Pfeffer  the programmer of the Xbox 360 port of Plants vs. Zombies. All Yes Good developed Octogeddon for the next four years.

Fan served as the designer, Werner served as the artist, and Pfeffer served as the programmer for Octogeddon. Jimmy Hinson provided the soundtrack. Octogeddon was released on February 8, 2018, for the video game digital distribution service, Steam. The game was met with positive reception, having a score of 82/100 on Metacritic. It was ported to the Nintendo Switch on May 16, 2019. Fan is currently listed as the creative director of All Yes Good.

Personal life
Fan lives in California; he went to University of California, Berkeley, for his college education, was based in San Francisco during the development of Plants vs. Zombies, worked in the San Mateo, California studio of PopCap Games by the time he was fired, and All Yes Good is currently based in Redwood Shores, California. His girlfriend is Shigihara, the composer for Plants vs. Zombies. Fan's hobbies include playing Magic: The Gathering and Lego building. He designed the card Genesis Hydra for the Magic: The Gathering core set Magic 2015.

Works

Notes

References

External links
Official website of Flying Bear Entertainment
Official website of All Yes Good

1978 births
Living people
American video game designers
Indie video game developers
Creative directors
University of California, Berkeley alumni
Blizzard Entertainment people